This is a list of royal commissions and commissions of inquiry appointed by the Government of Victoria. Royal Commissions are currently held in Victoria under the terms of the Inquiries Act 2014. This list includes Royal Commissions that were conducted jointly with the Government of Australia. Note that this list excludes Select Committees.

History

Timeline

See also

List of Australian royal commissions
List of New South Wales royal commissions
List of Queensland commissions of inquiry
List of South Australian royal commissions
List of Western Australian royal commissions

References

Royal commissions
Lists of public inquiries

External links 
 Current Victorian government inquiries and Royal Commissions
 Archive of website of The Royal Commission into Family Violence
 The Royal Commission into Victoria's Mental Health System
 Royal Commission into the Management of Police Informants
 Royal Commission into the Casino Operator and Licence